William Byrd Hotel is a historic hotel building located in Richmond, Virginia.  It was built in 1925, and is an 11-story, Classical Revival style building consisting of a base, shaft and capital.  It is a steel frame building clad in limestone, buff brick, and with terra cotta decorative elements.  The building is topped by a three-story penthouse with a one-story addition.  The hotel ceased operation in the 1980s, and the building was renovated into apartments in 1996. Currently, the William Byrd Apartments are owned by Project: Homes, a regional nonprofit dedicated to providing housing for low-income seniors.

It was listed on the National Register of Historic Places in 1996.

References

Hotel buildings on the National Register of Historic Places in Virginia
Neoclassical architecture in Virginia
Hotel buildings completed in 1925
Hotels in Richmond, Virginia
National Register of Historic Places in Richmond, Virginia